Winter Tour '05–'06 is a live album by the band Slightly Stoopid that was released in 2006. A live DVD recorded in San Diego, CA on November 26 and 25, 2005 was also released to coincide with the album.

Track listing

Disc 1
 "Intro"
 "Bandelero"
 "Everything You Need"
 "Ese Loco"
 "Wiseman"
 "Jimi Baby"
 "Dancing Mood"
 "Basher"
 "Johnny Law"
 "'Till It Gets Wet"
 "Mellow Mood"
 "Prophet"
 "Perfect Gentleman"

Disc 2
 "This Joint"
 "Older"
 "Runnin' With A Gun"
 "Officer"
 "Tribulation"
 "Cool Down"
 "Ain't Gotta Lotta Money"
 "Encore (Slightly Stoopid Chant)"
 "Closer to the Sun"
 "Couldn't Get High/Untitled"
 "Anti Socialistic"

DVD track listing
 "Intro"
 "Bandelero"
 "Everything You Need"
 "Ese Loco"
 "Wiseman"
 "Jimi Baby"
 "Johnny Law"
 "Officer"
 "Runnin' With A Gun"
 "'Till It Gets Wet"
 "Basher"
 "Fireshot"
 "She Bangs"
 "Cool Down"
 "Mellow Mood"
 "Ain't Gotta Lotta Money"
 "Couldn't Get High/Untitled"
 "Stoned Saga"
 "Collie Man"
 "Anti Socialistic"

References

Slightly Stoopid albums
2006 live albums
Live video albums
2006 video albums